Shaarey Zedek Cemetery may refer to:
 Shaarey Zedek Cemetery (Winnipeg)
 Shaare Zedek Cemetery, Jerusalem

See also
 Shaare Zedek (disambiguation)